In geology, depositional environment or sedimentary environment describes the combination of physical, chemical, and biological processes associated with the deposition of a particular type of sediment and, therefore, the rock types that will be formed after lithification, if the sediment is preserved in the rock record. In most cases, the environments associated with particular rock types or associations of rock types can be matched to existing analogues. However, the further back in geological time sediments were deposited, the more likely that direct modern analogues are not available (e.g. banded iron formations).

Types of depositional environments

Continental

  – type of Fluvial deposit. Caused by moving water in a fan shape (Alluvial Fan) and containing mostly impermeable and nonporous sediments well sorted.
 . Often in deserts and coastal regions and well sorted, large scale cross-beds
  – processes due to moving water, mainly streams. Common sediments are gravel, sand, and silt.
  – processes due to moving water, mainly lakes. Common sediments are sand, silt, and clay.

Transitional

  (possible cross beds, ripple marks) Common sediments are sand, silt, and clay.
  – processes due to tidal currents, creates tidal flats (fine-grained, ripple marks, cross-beds). Common sediments are silt and clay
 . Little transportation, creates lagoon bottom environment. Common sediments are carbonates (in tropical climates).
 . Caused by waves and longshore currents. Creates beaches, spits, and sandbars with the common sediments of gravel and sand.
 
Marine

  – processes due to waves and tidal currents, creates shelves and slopes, lagoons. Common sediments are carbonates (in tropical climates) or sand, silt, and clay (elsewhere)

  (abyssal plains) caused by ocean currents. Common sediments are clay, carbonate mud, silica mud.
  caused by waves and tidal currents. Also creates adjacent basins. Common sediments are carbonates.

Others
 
 
Till – angular to rounded grains, poorly sorted, unstratified (massive)
Outwash – ripple marks, cross-beds, similar to stream channel

Recognition of depositional environments in ancient sediments

Depositional environments in ancient sediments are recognised using a combination of sedimentary facies, facies associations, sedimentary structures and fossils, particularly trace fossil assemblages, as they indicate the environment in which they lived.

References

 Harold G. Reading. 1996. Sedimentary Environments: Processes, Facies and Stratigraphy. Blackwell Publishing Limited.

External links
 Sedimentary Environments Classification Charts 
 Depositional environments on e-notes

Sedimentology
Deposition (geology)